Hertingfordbury railway station was a station at Hertingfordbury, Hertfordshire, England, on the Hertford and Welwyn Junction Railway. It was a passenger station from December 1858 until 18 June 1951. It had a single platform and a small goods yard to the east. The line was finally closed to all traffic in 1962.

The station building has been converted to a private residence, with the old line open as a public right of way, named the Cole Green Way.

References

Disused railway stations in Hertfordshire
Former Great Northern Railway stations
Railway stations in Great Britain opened in 1858
Railway stations in Great Britain closed in 1951
1858 establishments in England
1951 disestablishments in England